This is a list of second overall National Football League Draft picks. The National Football League Draft is an annual sports draft in which National Football League (NFL) teams select newly eligible players for their rosters. The second overall picks include 40 players who have received Pro Bowl honors, 11 players who have been inducted into the Pro Football Hall of Fame, and six Heisman Trophy winners. In 2012, Sports Illustrated chose linebacker Lawrence Taylor as the best player selected second overall in an NFL draft.

Recent second-overall picks have included Defensive Rookies of the Year Nick Bosa (2019) and Chase Young (2020), as well as Offensive Rookie of the Year Saquon Barkley (2018). Four members of the NFL 2010s All-Decade Team were drafted with the No. 2 pick: linebacker Von Miller (2011), defensive end Ndamukong Suh (2010), wide receiver Calvin Johnson (2007), and defensive end Julius Peppers (2002). The universities with the most players selected second overall in the draft are Notre Dame with six, Texas A&M with five, and Baylor, Michigan State, North Carolina, and USC with four each. The NFL franchises who have had the second overall pick most frequently are the Cleveland/St. Louis/Los Angeles Rams (nine), Philadelphia Eagles, and Detroit Lions (six each).

List

Overview
A total of 40 second overall picks have received Pro Bowl Honors.  Of those, 11 have been inducted into the Pro Football Hall of Fame: Sid Luckman (1939), George McAfee (1940), Les Richter (1952), Bob Brown (1964), Tom Mack (1966), Randy White (1975), Tony Dorsett (1977), Lawrence Taylor (1981), Eric Dickerson (1983), Marshall Faulk (1994), and Calvin Johnson (2007). 

In addition, six Heisman Trophy winners have been selected with the second overall pick: Glenn Davis (1946), Billy Vessels (1952), John David Crow (1957), Reggie Bush (2006), Robert Griffin III (2012), and Marcus Mariota (2014).

In 2012, Sports Illustrated chose Lawrence Taylor as the best player selected second overall. Other No. 2 picks ranked as contenders by Sports Illustrated included Calvin Johnson, Julius Peppers, Donovan McNabb (1999), Tony Boselli (1995), Marshall Faulk, Eric Dickerson, Tony Dorsett, and Randy White.

Notable draft busts selected with the No. 2 pick include Lam Jones (1980), Tony Mandarich (1989), Blair Thomas (1990), Ryan Leaf (1998), Charles Rogers (2003), and Jason Smith (2009).

See also
 List of first overall National Football League Draft picks

References

picks